Bajracharya is a Nepalese surname. Notable people with this surname include:
Jharana Bajracharya, Nepalese actress
Sahana Bajracharya, Nepalese model
Nhyoo Bajracharya, Nepalese singer
Nisthananda Bajracharya, Nepalese author
Samita Bajracharya, Nepalese former Kumari
Chanira Bajracharya, Nepalese former Kumari
Dayananda Bajracharya, Nepalese professor

Surnames of Nepalese origin